"My Girl" is a song by American rock musician Donnie Iris from his 1981 album King Cool. The song was released as a single the following year and reached #25 on the U.S. Billboard Hot 100 chart.  It was his highest charting hit single, the last of three which reached the Top 40.

The song has a late '50s and '60s inspired doo-wop and R&B music inspired beat and composition.

Charts

References

External links
 Lyrics of this song
 

Donnie Iris songs
1982 singles
Songs written by Mark Avsec
1981 songs
Songs written by Donnie Iris
MCA Records singles